Onchidella floridana is a species of air-breathing sea slug, a shell-less marine pulmonate gastropod mollusk in the family Onchidiidae.

Description

Distribution
This species occurs in the Caribbean Sea and the Gulf of Mexico. And was once ubiquitous in and around the shallow waters - intertidal zones - of Bermuda.  Never located on the rugged, storm-tossed Atlantic Ocean side of the Island. Observed, studied & photographed by graduate student(s) attending Marine Ecology Summer Program at Bermuda Biological Station in 1985.

References

 Dayrat, B. (2009) Review of the current knowledge of the systematics of Onchidiidae (Mollusca: Gastropoda: Pulmonata) with a checklist of nominal species. Zootaxa 2068: 1–26
 Rosenberg, G., F. Moretzsohn, and E. F. García. 2009. Gastropoda (Mollusca) of the Gulf of Mexico, Pp. 579–699 in Felder, D.L. and D.K. Camp (eds.), Gulf of Mexico–Origins, Waters, and Biota. Biodiversity. Texas A&M Press, College Station, Texas

External links

Onchidiidae
Gastropods described in 1885